Novouvalsky is a rural locality (a settlement) in Zakovryashinsky Selsoviet, Krutikhinsky District, Altai Krai, Russia. The population was 18 as of 2013. There are 2 streets.

Geography 
Novouvalsky is located 20 km south of Krutikha (the district's administrative centre) by road. Karasi and Dresvyanka are the nearest rural localities.

References 

Rural localities in Krutikhinsky District